HMS Medina was a 2-gun Merlin-class paddle packet boat built for the Royal Navy during the 1830s. The ship remained in ordinary until she was commissioned in 1848. She was converted into a survey ship in 1856 and was broken up in March 1864.

Description
The ship's tonnage was 889  tons burthen. The Medusa class was fitted with a pair of steam engines, rated at 312 nominal horsepower, that drove their paddlewheels. The ships were armed with a pair of 6-pounder carronades.

Construction and career
Medina, the twelfth ship of her name to serve in the Royal Navy, was ordered on 30 March 1838, laid down in June 1839 at Pembroke Dockyard, Wales, and launched on 18 March 1840. She was completed in April 1840, but was not commissioned until 19 October 1848 for packet duties in the Mediterranean.

During the Crimean War, she collided with the British barque Agnes Blaikie in the Black Sea off Balaklava, Russia; Agnes Blaikie sank, but her crew were rescued.

Medina was converted into a survey ship on 7 January 1856. On 27 October 1857, she ran aground in the Kilia Channel. She was refloated with the assistance of the Royal Sardinian Navy steamship . In August 1862, she assisted in the refloating of the British steamship Dalmatian, which had run aground in the Gulf of Smyrna.

Medina was paid off on 10 November 1863 at Malta and scrapped in March 1864.

Notes

References

 

Merlin-class packet boat
1840 ships
Ships built in Pembroke Dock
Maritime incidents in October 1841
Maritime incidents in May 1855
Maritime incidents in October 1857